Leptothyra rubens is a species of small sea snail with calcareous opercula, a marine gastropod mollusk in the family Colloniidae.

Distribution
This marine species occurs in the Gulf of Oman and in the Persian Gulf.

References

External links
 To World Register of Marine Species

Colloniidae
Gastropods described in 1903